Vogričevci (in older sources Vogričovci) is a settlement in the Municipality of Ljutomer in northeastern Slovenia. The area traditionally belonged to the Styria region and is now included in the Mura Statistical Region.

The local chapel in the centre of the settlement was built in the Neo-Gothic style in the late 19th century.

References

External links
Vogričevci on Geopedia

Populated places in the Municipality of Ljutomer